The Franklin Glacier Complex is a deeply eroded volcano in the Waddington Range of southwestern British Columbia, Canada.

Magmatic activity of the Franklin Glacier Complex spanned roughly four million years from the Late Miocene to the Early Pleistocene, with the most recently identified volcanic eruption having taken place around 2.2 million years ago. The existence of thermal springs near the complex implies that magmatic heat is still present. It has therefore been of interest to geothermal exploration.

Geography
The area lies in one of British Columbia's many territorial divisions called the Range 2 Coast Land District. It is part of the Waddington Range, a subrange of the Pacific Ranges which in turn are a subdivision of the Coast Mountains.

The Franklin Glacier Complex was covered by the Cordilleran Ice Sheet until its retreat about 13,000 years ago. Franklin Glacier has since undergone glacial retreat and expansion throughout the Holocene. It appears to have retreated significantly during the early Holocene warm period, followed by advancements 6,300, 5,400, 4,600, 4,100, 3,100, 2,400, 1,500, 800 and 600 years ago. The timing of expansions corresponded with cool summer temperatures, generally moist conditions and increased precipitation.

Geology
Minimal geologic studies have been conducted at the Franklin Glacier Complex and its geology is therefore poorly known. Volcanic rocks of the Franklin Glacier Complex consist predominantly of dacite breccia, minor dacite flows and a few hornblende andesite remnants. An absence of pumice, glassy blocks or bombs in the breccia suggests that it may be of epiclastic origin, possibly formed during collapse and infilling of a caldera. The complex has therefore been described as a caldera or a cauldron subsidence. Heavy erosion of the volcanic rocks has exposed a series of biotite-quartz-porphyry, biotite quartz-feldspar-porphyry and quartz monzonite subvolcanic plutons and dike swarms. They intrude through fractured and hydrothermally altered Mesozoic to early Tertiary granitic and metamorphic rocks of the Coast Plutonic Complex.

The complex lies on the overlapping trend of the Garibaldi and Pemberton volcanic belts, which were formed as a result of subduction zone magmatism along the Cascade Volcanic Arc in the last 29 million years. Two separate stages of magmatic activity have been identified at the Franklin Glacier Complex. The first magmatic stage about 6.8 million years ago involved the central emplacement of an elongated quartz monzonite stock. At least five porphyry and transitional vein-type mineral occurrences were deposited during this period. A series of smaller intrusions were emplaced during the second magmatic stage 2.2 to 3.9 million years ago, at least some of which appear to have been feeders for the overlying volcanic pile. The Franklin Glacier Complex is substantially older than the neighbouring Silverthrone Caldera to the northwest.

Immediately west of the Franklin Glacier Complex are a series of hot springs confined in valleys. At Canyon Lake, a hot spring feeds a small stream that flows into the southeastern end of that lake. A single temperature of  has been obtained from this spring while the Hoodoo Creek and Pinter spring temperatures remain unknown. The existence of these hot springs has made the Franklin Glacier Complex a target for geothermal exploration but little work has been conducted due to its remote location. The only performed exploration has been moderate geologic mapping. A 50 megawatt binary plant has been proposed at Canyon Lake.

History
Mineral exploration at the Franklin Glacier Complex has occurred sporadically since at least the 1960s. The earliest recorded work was done by Kennco Exploration Limited with the staking of claims in a zone of copper-molybdenum mineralization associated with the quartz monzonite stock. Kennco conducted no further work which led to the eventual lapse of their mineral claims in 1976. The area was restaked later that year by United Mineral Services Limited who would conduct reconnaissance mapping and regional research. Mineral claims were staked once again in 1996 by F. Onucki and J. R. Deighton for the purpose of locating reported high-grade silver mineralization.

Franklin Glacier was skied by Canadian mountaineers Don and Phyllis Munday on July 22, 1930 while exploring and mapping glaciers of the Waddington Range. Don Munday named the glacier in 1927 for its association with the Franklin River which in turn was named after a Benjamin Franklin at Tatla Lake.

See also
List of volcanoes in Canada
List of Cascade volcanoes

References

Volcanoes of British Columbia
Miocene volcanoes
Pliocene volcanoes
Pleistocene volcanoes
Polygenetic volcanoes
Subduction volcanoes
Calderas of British Columbia
Garibaldi Volcanic Belt
Pemberton Volcanic Belt
Stocks (geology)
Hot springs of British Columbia
Geothermal energy in Canada
Pacific Ranges
Miocene Canada
Range 2 Coast Land District